Rational Rhapsody, a modeling environment based on UML, is a visual development environment for systems engineers and software developers creating real-time or embedded systems and software. Rational Rhapsody uses graphical models to generate software applications in various languages including C, C++, Ada, Java and C#.

Developers use Rational Rhapsody to understand and elaborate requirements, create model designs using industry standard languages (UML, SysML, AUTOSAR, DoDAF, MODAF, UPDM), validate functionality early in development, and automate delivery of high structured products.

Rational Rhapsody Model Manager (previous implementation, Design Manager, will be deprecated) is a web based application that stakeholders, developers, and other team members use to collaborate on the design of products, software, and systems. The product contains a server that hosts model designs which have been developed in Rational Rhapsody. A client extension component included with Rational Rhapsody allows users to connect to a Design Manager server. After connecting to the server, models can be moved into project areas with specific modelling domains based on the industry standard languages supported by Rational Rhapsody.  Rhapsody Model Manager also integrates with the Rational solution for Collaborative Lifecycle Management (CLM). In this environment, artifacts can be associated with other lifecycle resources such as requirements (the Doors Next Generation application), change requests and change sets of sources (the Team Concert Application), and Quality Assurance test cases (the Quality Manager application). Global Configuration control allows different teams and different projects to interact in a synchronised setup that integrates deliveries and baselines within each of the tools in the CLM solution.

History
Rhapsody was first released in 1996 by Israeli software company I-Logix Inc. Rhapsody was developed as an object-oriented tool for modeling and executing statecharts, based on work done by David Harel at the Weizmann Institute of Science, who was the first to develop the concept of hierarchical, parallel, and broadcasting statecharts.

In 2006, I-Logix's shareholders sold the company to Swedish software company Telelogic AB. Rhapsody became a Rational Software product after the acquisition of Telelogic AB in 2008, like all former Telelogic products. Since the rebranding, Rational Rhapsody has been integrated with the IBM Rational Systems and Software Engineering Solution.

Rational Rhapsody Design Manager was first released in June, 2011 by IBM. In December 2011, the product was integrated as a design component in IBM Rational Solution for Collaborative Lifecycle Management (CLM).

See also
List of UML tools

References 

Real-Time UML by Bruce Powel Douglass
Real-Time UML Workshop by Bruce Powel Douglass
Real-Time Agility by Bruce Powel Douglass
Real-Time Design Patterns by Bruce Powel Douglass
Design Patterns for Embedded Systems in C by Bruce Powel Douglass
Agile Systems Engineering by Bruce Powel Douglass

External links
Rational Rhapsody product home page
Rational Rhapsody Forum
IBM Knowledge Center for Rational Rhapsody
Knowledge Center for Rational solution for Collaborative Lifecycle Management
Rational Rhapsody Wiki on IBM developerWorks
jazz.net
Bruce Douglass' Web Site on MDD and MBSE with Rhapsody

UML tools
Rhapsody
IBM software 
Diagramming software 
Enterprise architecture 
Enterprise architecture frameworks 
Modeling languages